"I Just Wanna Live" is the second single from American rock band Good Charlotte's third studio album, The Chronicles of Life and Death,  Officially released on January 17, 2005, "I Just Wanna Live" was one of the songs that Sony paid radio stations to play in the 2005 payola scandal. As single from the album, it carried on Good Charlotte's commercial success; it was certified gold in Australia and the United States, and it achieved high chart placements worldwide.

Music video
The music video was directed by Brett Simon. The video opens with Good Charlotte performing in front of an unenthused and small crowd at a bar in Baltimore. Down on their luck and in need of funds, the band quit performing to work at a supermarket handing out flyers while dressed in various foods, only to find similar success. While dejectedly eating lunch on the side of the road, a record executive in a limousine passes by and, seeing a way to make a fortune from the group, signs them into his label. Now calling themselves The Food Group, their debut album, All U Can Eat, becomes a success and rockets the band to national and international stardom, especially among women in the young adult and teen range.

As the band continues to enjoy rising popularity and a life of debauchery, they start getting wrapped up in a myriad of scandals that diminish their popularity: Benji Madden (Corn) is arrested after getting involved in a high-speed chase with the police. Billy Martin (Strawberry) and Chris Wilson (Carrot) indiscriminately assault a paparazzi member. Paul Thomas (Burger) makes a sexually suggestive move with an underage girl dressed as an ice cream cone, leading to a ban of The Food Group by the PTA. Joel Madden (Pizza) is caught up in a lip-sync mishap while performing live, which he blames on his indigestion. With The Food Group's reputation tarnished and their former fans now against them following the scandals, the band eventually discards their food suits and return to performing as a little-known rock band.

Track listings
UK CD1
 "I Just Wanna Live" – 2:46
 "Mountain" (live from Sessions@AOL) – 3:53

UK CD2 and Australian CD single
 "I Just Wanna Live" – 2:46
 "S.O.S." (live from Sessions@AOL) – 3:28
 "The World Is Black" (live from Sessions@AOL) – 3:10
 "I Just Wanna Live" (video) – 2:46

UK 7-inch picture disc
A. "I Just Wanna Live" – 2:46
B. "S.O.S." (live from Sessions@AOL) – 3:28

Charts

Weekly charts

Year-end charts

Certifications

Release history

References

2004 songs
2005 singles
Daylight Records singles
Epic Records singles
Good Charlotte songs
Protest songs
Song recordings produced by Eric Valentine
Songs written by Benji Madden
Songs written by Joel Madden
Songs written by John Feldmann
Music videos directed by Brett Simon